Burke Thomas, also known as Burke Thomas Overdrive, is an American musician and record producer, who is the drummer of Duff McKagan's Loaded and Vendetta Red. Thomas began his career with the band Muzzle, recording on the studio album Betty Pickup in 1996, before forming a solo project entitled Pris, performing all the instruments on the album The Kiss Off, released in 2004.

Thomas first joined Vendetta Red in 2001, recording on their fourth album Sisters of the Red Death released in 2005. The album itself peaked at number 27 on the Billboard Top Heatseekers. When the band broke up in 2006, Thomas would go on to form a number of projects including The Treatment and Megasapien, releasing their debut album Surrender in 2011, before Vendetta Red reunited in 2010 to record a new album with producer Terry Date the following year. Burke filled in on drums for Duff McKagan's Loaded for the halftime show performance at the Seattle Seahawks vs. The New York Giants game in 2010. He has been the full time drummer for the band since 2011.

Drum Recovery Network on Jun 14, 2020 Burke Thomas launched the "Drum Recovery Network" on YouTube and AnchorFm. The series is aimed at helping musicians and non musicians who have suffered major injury heal through community, conversation and the power of positivity. Thomas covers a variety of subjects in the videos including album/band revues, spinal cord stretches/therapy and interviews. Guests of the show have included Dave Barbarossa of "Bow Wow Wow", Martin Chambers of "The Pretenders", Kelli Scott of "Failure", Chris Fantz of "The Talking Heads", Jerry Gaskill of "Kings X" and Don Coffey Jr. of "Superdrag"

Discography
Pris
 The Kiss Off (2004)

with Muzzle
 Betty Pickup (1996)

with Vendetta Red
 Sisters of the Red Death (2005)

with Megasapien
 Surrender'' (2011)

References

External links
 

Living people
American rock drummers
Vendetta Red members
Year of birth missing (living people)